Julio Gallardo (16 June 1942 – 21 June 1991) was a Chilean footballer. He played in nine matches for the Chile national football team from 1967 to 1969. He was also part of Chile's squad for the 1967 South American Championship.

References

External links
 

1942 births
1991 deaths
Chilean footballers
Chile international footballers
Association football forwards
Club Deportivo Universidad Católica footballers
Club Deportivo Palestino footballers
Chilean Primera División players
People from Villarrica